Virtue is the first album of the gospel group Virtue. The self-titled release spawned three singles "Greatest Part Of Me ", "Let the Redeemed", and "I Must Tell Jesus".

Track listing
Let The Redeemed - 4:42
Your Love Lifted Me - 4:03
So Good To Know - 4:31
Greatest Part of Me - 5:13
Quiet Times - 5:11
Lord You Are Worthy (Interlude) - 0:52
Take It By Force - 4:21
Through Your Name - 4:45
I Must Tell Jesus - 4:19
Cry No More - 4:43
Be With You - 4:34

Charts

References

 

1997 debut albums
Virtue (musical group) albums